Herbert Emmett was an English footballer who played in the Football League for Rotherham County and Rotherham United.

References

English footballers
Association football midfielders
English Football League players
Rotherham Town F.C. (1899) players
Rotherham County F.C. players
Rotherham United F.C. players